James Wynd (born 11 November 1964) is a former Australian rules footballer who played for  in the Victorian Football League (VFL) and Australian Football League (AFL).

He then went on to play for Central Districts in the South Australian National Football League (SANFL).

He is now a manager with the YMCA in Victoria.

References

External links
 
 

1964 births
Living people
Fitzroy Football Club players
Australian rules footballers from Victoria (Australia)
Victorian State of Origin players
Central District Football Club players